Ric Launspach (born 19 July 1958, in Arnhem, Gelderland, The Netherlands) is a Dutch actor, writer and director. He is married to actress Marjolein Beumer and is the brother-in-law to Famke Janssen and Antoinette Beumer.

Early life and career 
Launspach began his career in theatre, he was rejected four times, only the fifth time he was accepted at the theatre academy in Amsterdam. Immediately after graduation, he founded two theatre companies, The Case in 1986 and The Trust in 1988. Between those two years he was on stage almost every day. He played the lead roles in many films and TV shows and directed several pieces.

In the late 1990s, he interrupted his career in the theatre, along with his wife Marjolein Beumer, to devote his time entirely to writing. In 2006 they made their first short film together, a TV series and a feature film.

In 2007, Launspach decided to start writing books, and in 2009 he released his debut novel 1953, referring to the year in which the Dutch dikes broke resulting in the big flood. The book was filmed, and renamed De Storm.

In September 2011, his second novel, Man Meisje Dood, was released.

Theatre 
 His (1987)
 The Seagull (1988)
 Krieg (1988)
 Pentisileia (1989)
 Platonov (1990)
 Faecalientrilogie, Schwab (1991–1993)
 Old People (1999)
 The Goat (2003)

Films and television 
 Kanaal 13 (1983), (1 episode - Een Beetje Verliefd)
 Zeg 'ns Aaa (1987), (1 episode - Echokabouter)
 De Tong van de Wet (1988), (TV)
 Jan Rap en z'n Maat (1989)
 De gulle Minnaar (1990) - Lucas
 Kracht (1990), (Vijour/Vigor) - Sjors
 Bij nader Inzien (1991), (TV mini-series) - Maarten Koning (Jong)
 Coverstory (1993), (1 episode - De Sluipwegen van de Dood)
 Oeroeg (1993) - Johan
 1000 Rosen (1994) - Mr. Marshall
 De Vlinder tilt de Kat Op (1994) - Anton
 Pleidooi (1994), (Called to the Bar) - Vader Kamstra
 De Partizanen (1995), (TV mini-series) - Rokus
 In Namm der Koningin (1996), (TV series) - Dirk Vierkens
 12 Steden, 13 Ongelukken (1991 & 1997), (2 episodes) - Paul
 Het Jarr van de Opvolging (1998), (TV mini-series) - Gijs van Dorp
 Oud Geld (1998), (3 episodes) - Robbert Donselaar
 Windkracht 10 (1998), (1 episode - Wie Zoet is, Krijgt Lekkers) - Ronald Brenneman
 Quidam, Quidam (1999) - Pro-deo Lawyer
 Innamorata (1999) - Hitman
 Baantjer (1996 & 1999), (2 episodes) - Karel Engel
 The Delivery (1999) - Spike
 Vroeger Bestaat niet Meer (2001), (TV) - Quinten Mensch
 De Vanger (2003) - Brother Ruben
  (2004), (The Dark Diamond) - Baron Roger de Lacheloze
 Bezet (2004), (Writer)
 Manderlay (2005) - Stanley Mays
 Van Speijk (2006–2007), (26 episodes) - Det. Lucas Visbeen
 Aspe (2007), (1 episode - Hoog Spel) - Arie Schippers
 Moes (2008), (TV mini-series) - Det. De Ru (also Director)
 Taartman (2009), (TV) - Bertrand
 De Storm (2009), (The Storm) - Majoor Vos (also Writer)
 Pauw & Witterman (2009), (1 episode - #3.82) - as himself
 De Gelukkige Huisvrouw (2010) - Dr. Kallenback
 Meiden van de Wit (2002–2010), (38 episodes) - Roy Geertse

Awards 
1993 - Golden Calf for Best Actor for his role in "Oeroeg"
1993 - "Arlecchino" for best supporting role "Schwab Trilogy"
1994 - Nomination "Arlecchino" for role in "Platonov"
1995 - "Best Actor" best TV drama production "Partisans"
1999 - "Geneva-Europe Prize" screenplay "Azara" city of a thousand bridges

References

External links 
 
 official site

1958 births
Living people
Dutch male actors
Golden Calf winners
People from Arnhem